The 2006 Junee bushfire, officially referred to as the "Jail Break Inn fire", was a bushfire that burned from 1–6 January and primarily affected the Riverina region in the Australian state of New South Wales. At least  of farmland and forest reserve in the municipality of Junee Shire were burned during the 6-day duration of the fire. Ten houses, four shearing sheds and numerous other vehicles and non-residential buildings were destroyed, and damage was also caused to the Junee Round House. The fire affected 200 properties in and around the communities of Bethungra, Eurongilly, Illabo, Junee and Old Junee.

During the major run of the fire that afternoon, John Heffernan, a local farmer and second cousin of Liberal senator Bill Heffernan, received third-degree burns to 60–80% of his body while trying to fight the fire.

Climate and weather setting 
On the morning of 1 January, the NSW Rural Fire Service issued a warning that temperatures would "...reach 43 degrees in some parts of the state, winds will gust up to 60 km/h from the northwest and humidity is expected to drop below 15 percent". A statewide total fire ban had already been declared from midnight 30 December 2005 to midnight 1 January 2006 in preparation for the severe conditions, and farmers in the south west of the state, including the Riverina region, were warned to stop harvesting crops to prevent machinery starting fires in paddocks.

The day also witnessed the 5th hottest day ever recorded at Observatory Hill in Sydney, as the temperature reached . Southeast of Junee—observed .

Fire timeline 

The prevailing winds caused the fire front to spread rapidly east towards Junee township over the next hour, and many residents were evacuated to Junee Bowling Club; it was during the two hours following 14:00 AEDT (UTC+11) that the majority of residential property was destroyed in and around the southern vicinity of Junee township, and the fire front jumped Harefield Rd. Some time after 16:00 AEDT (UTC+11), a cold front with predominantly southerly winds passed through the fire ground, prompting the fire front to move in a more northerly direction, towards Illabo. During the first 9 hours, the fire had spread  from the point of ignition and prompted the closure of the Olympic Highway and the Main Southern Railway line.

On 3 January, Junee Shire was declared a natural disaster zone, pursuant to the State Natural Disaster Relief and Recovery Arrangements, and those affected were able to claim assistance funding.

References

External links

 
 

History of New South Wales
Bushfires in New South Wales
2006 in Australia
2006 fires in Oceania
2000s in New South Wales